Kal'ai Mug is an archaeological site and ruins of a fortress on Mount Mug, beside the Zeravshan River in Tajikistan.
The fort is significant as it was the last stronghold of the confederacy of five Sogdian  kingdoms to resist the Islamic invasion. When the fort was breached it was filled with refugees and the king Devashtich was executed in the main square of the fort.

The fort was originally a two-story building made of stone and brick measuring 18.5 × 19.5 m and dates to the 8th century.

References

Historic sites in Tajikistan